The 2012 World Cyber Games (also known as WCG 2012) took place from 29 November to 2 December 2012 in Kunshan, Jiangsu, China. It was the second time the World Cyber Games (WCG) was held in China. The event hosted 500 players from 40 countries competing for prize pool over $258,000.

Official games

PC games
 Crossfire (SmileGate)
 Dota 2 (Valve)
 FIFA 12 (Electronic Arts)
 StarCraft II: Wings of Liberty (Blizzard)
 Warcraft III: The Frozen Throne (Blizzard)

Promotion games
 Counter-Strike Online (Nexon/Valve)
 Defense of the Ancients (IceFrog)
 QQ Speed (Tencent Holdings)
 World of Tanks (Wargaming)

Results

Official

Promotion

References

2012 in Chinese sport
2012 in esports
Dota competitions
StarCraft competitions
Warcraft competitions
World Cyber Games events
Esports competitions in China
Sport in Suzhou
Kunshan
November 2012 sports events in Asia
December 2012 sports events in Asia